Tusukuru is a genus of sheet weavers that was first described by K. Y. Eskov in 1993.

Species
 it contains only two species:
Tusukuru hartlandianus (Emerton, 1913) – USA
Tusukuru tamburinus Eskov, 1993 – Russia

See also
 List of Linyphiidae species (Q–Z)

References

Araneomorphae genera
Linyphiidae
Spiders of Russia
Spiders of the United States